The 2015 Aircel Chennai Open was a men's 2015 ATP World Tour tennis tournament, played on outdoor hard courts. It was the 20th edition of the only ATP tournament taking place in India and took place at the SDAT Tennis Stadium in Chennai, India, from 5 January through 11 January 2015. Stan Wawrinka won the singles title.

Points and prize money

Point distribution

Prize money 

*per team

Singles main-draw entrants

Seeds

1 Rankings as of 29 December 2014

Other entrants
The following players received wildcards into the singles main draw:
  Somdev Devvarman
  Ramkumar Ramanathan
  Elias Ymer

The following players received entry from the qualifying draw:
  Aljaž Bedene 
  Evgeny Donskoy 
  N Vijay Sundar Prashanth 
  Luca Vanni

Retirements
  Marcel Granollers (knee injury)

Doubles main-draw entrants

Seeds

1 Rankings as of 29 December 2014

Other entrants
The following pairs received wildcards into the doubles main draw:
  Sriram Balaji /  Jeevan Nedunchezhiyan
  Mahesh Bhupathi /  Saketh Myneni

The following pair received entry as alternates:
  Chandril Sood /  Lakshit Sood

Withdrawals
Before the tournament
  Alejandro González (shoulder injury)

Finals

Singles 

  Stan Wawrinka defeated  Aljaž Bedene, 6–3, 6–4

Doubles 

  Lu Yen-hsun /  Jonathan Marray defeated   Raven Klaasen /  Leander Paes, 6–3, 7–6(7–4)

References

External links 
Official website